Pouteria leptopedicellata is a species of plant in the family Sapotaceae. It is found in Costa Rica and Panama.

References

leptopedicellata
Flora of Costa Rica
Flora of Panama
Vulnerable plants
Taxonomy articles created by Polbot